McCook station is an Amtrak intercity train station in McCook, Nebraska. It is served daily by Amtrak's California Zephyr. The depot opened on April 13, 1926 by the Chicago, Burlington and Quincy Railroad to replace an earlier structure from 1882. The brown brick depot features Tudor Revival detailing as seen in the pointed arch windows and the buttresses that divide the facades into regular bays.

References

External links

McCook Amtrak Station (USA RailGuide -- TrainWeb)

Amtrak stations in Nebraska
Buildings and structures in Red Willow County, Nebraska
Former Chicago, Burlington and Quincy Railroad stations
1926 establishments in Nebraska
Railway stations in the United States opened in 1926